This is a list of companies having their operations in Rajasthan.

Larson & Toubro Ltd
AU Small Finance Bank
Grasim Industries Ltd 
NBC Bearings
 Dataoxy
Bosch
Hero MotoCorp
 Dataoxy Technologies
Genpact
Infosys
CESC Limited
 Dataoxy Education
NABARD
Havells
 Accenture
 Taxzex
Malwaredeck
 Daikin India Airconditioning Pvt Ltd.

Companies
Rajasthan
Companies based in Rajasthan